Le Lussex railway station is a former railway station in the municipality of Jouxtens-Mézery, in the Swiss canton of Vaud. The stop was eliminated with the 13 December 2020 timetable change in order to improve timekeeping over the line.

References

External links 
 
 

Railway stations in the canton of Vaud
Lausanne–Echallens–Bercher Railway stations
Disused railway stations in Switzerland
Railway stations closed in 2020